Myron Melvin Cowen (January 25, 1898 – November 1, 1965) was an American lawyer and diplomat, who served as US Ambassador to Australia, Belgium and Philippines.

Biography

Cowen was born in Logan, Iowa. His father was Aaron Harry and mother was Dora T. Blala Cowen. Cowen studied in Wofford College of Spartanburg, S.C. from 1914–1915 and graduated from Drake University of Des Moines in 1918.  From 1919 to 1926, he practiced law in Des Moines. From 1926 to 1933, he was the commissioner for the US court of Appeals in Washington D.C, where he continued his legal practice from 1935 to 1948. He was appointed US Ambassador to Australia from 1948 to 1949 and afterwards served as US ambassador to Philippines from 1949 to 1952. He expected a less corrupt and capable government for Philippine and suggested a covert action to oust then Philippine president, Elpidio Quirino. From 1952 to 1953, he was US ambassador to Belgium. Until his death in Washington, D.C. he practiced law.

References

1898 births
1965 deaths
Ambassadors of the United States to Australia
Ambassadors of the United States to Belgium
Ambassadors of the United States to the Philippines
20th-century American diplomats
People from Logan, Iowa
Lawyers from Washington, D.C.
20th-century American lawyers